Ishenbai Duyshonbiyevich Kadyrbekov (born July 16, 1949) was the Chairman of the Legislative Assembly of Kyrgyzstan and the interim president of Kyrgyzstan in March 2005.

References

See also
 Politics of Kyrgyzstan
 2005 Kyrgyz parliamentary elections
 Askar Akayev

1949 births
Living people
Presidents of Kyrgyzstan
Chairmen of the Legislative Assembly of Kyrgyzstan
Government ministers of Kyrgyzstan
Kyrgyzstani Sunni Muslims
People from Naryn